Maja Scarlett Wallstein (born 18 March 1986) is a German politician of the Social Democratic Party (SPD) who has been serving as a member of the Bundestag since 2021.

Early life and career
Wallstein was born 1986 in the East German city of Cottbus and studied polonistic at the University of Potsdam and the Jagiellonian University.

Wallstein worked as parliamentary advisor at the Bundestag from 2013 to 2017 and as advisor on political communications and research policy at the Helmholtz Association from 2018 to 2020.

Political career
Wallstein became a member of the Bundestag in the 2021 elections, representing the Cottbus – Spree-Neiße district. In parliament, she has since been serving on the Committee on Education, Research and Technology Assessment. She is her parliamentary group’s spokesperson on research policy. 

Within her parliamentary group, Wallstein is part of a working group on strategies against right-wing extremism.

Other activities
 German Foundation for Peace Research (DSF), Member of the Board (since 2022)

References 

Living people
People from Cottbus
1986 births
Social Democratic Party of Germany politicians
21st-century German politicians
Members of the Bundestag 2021–2025